Dove Creek is a stream in the Wright County, Missouri. It is a tributary of Whetstone Creek.

The headwaters arise about five miles north of Mountain Grove just west of Missouri Route 95. The stream flows NNW roughly parallel to Route 95 past Dawson and turns west just east of Rayborn then flows under Missouri Route 38 just west of Rayborn. It continues west parallel to Route 38 to its confluence with Whetstone Creek about one half mile south of the confluence of Whetstone Creek with the Gasconade River.

Dove Creek was so named due to the presence of doves near its course.

See also
List of rivers of Missouri

References

Rivers of Wright County, Missouri
Rivers of Missouri